George Bisset (born 10 March 1943) is a former Australian rules footballer.

Footscray
He played as a rover and spent most of his career at Footscray.

1969 Brownlow Medal
In 1969, Bisset came second to Fitzroy's Kevin Murray by one vote.

Bisset had been reported for striking Carlton's Ian Robertson during the 12 July 1969 match against Carlton; and, although evidence was given that Bisset had punched Robertson (who had also been reported for striking Bisset) at least six times, the charge against Bisset was not sustained.

As a result of being reported, Bisset was not eligible to receive Brownlow votes (for the best player amongst the fairest) for that match; and, given that he had more than 30 "disposals" and had kicked 6 goals, it was very likely that he would have received, at least, one vote.

Team of the Century
He is a half forward in Footscray's official Team of the Century.

Collingwood
Moving to Collingwood in 1973 under the short-lived VFL's "10-year rule", which allowed players with ten years' service at one club to move to another club without a clearance, Bisset played 41 games in two seasons (1973 and 1974) and kicked 49 goals.

Footnotes

External links

 Boyles Football Photos: George Bisset
 George Bisset (1973-1974): Collingwood Forever.

1943 births
Australian rules footballers from Victoria (Australia)
Western Bulldogs players
Collingwood Football Club players
Charles Sutton Medal winners
Braybrook Football Club players
Living people